Gastrodia entomogama, commonly known as the Brindabella potato orchid, is a leafless terrestrial mycotrophic orchid in the family Orchidaceae. It has a dark brown or blackish flowering stem with up to sixty brown, warty, tube-shaped flowers. It is only known for certain from the Australian Capital Territory.

Description 
Gastrodia entomogama is a leafless terrestrial, mycotrophic herb that has a thick, fleshy, brittle, dark brown to blackish flowering stem bearing between five and sixty light brown to dark brown, tube-shaped flowers that are rough and warty outside and white inside. The petals have irregular or wavy edges. Flowering occurs from December to January but the flowers are self-pollinating.

Taxonomy and naming
Gastrodia entomogama was first formally described in 1991 by David Jones from a specimen he collected on Mount Franklin in 1990. The description was published in Australian Orchid Research. The specific epithet (entomogama) is derived from the Ancient Greek words entomon meaning "insect" and gamos meaning "marriage" or "union", referring to the flowers originally being described as insect-pollinated.

Distribution and habitat
The Brindabella potato orchid grows with shrubs and grasses in forest. It is only known for certain from a few locations in the Australian Capital Territory.

References 

entomogama
Plants described in 1964
Terrestrial orchids
Orchids of the Australian Capital Territory